The South Hills are the small foothills in various Montana communities, most notably those at elevation ,  south of Missoula, Montana in Missoula County. Several districts of Missoula are also in the South Hills, such as Whitaker Heights/Farviews Neighborhood, Hillview Heights/South Hills Neighborhood, and Miller Creek-Linda Vista.

See also
 List of mountain ranges in Montana

Notes

Mountain ranges of Montana
Mountains Ranges and Peaks in Missoula County, Montana
Landforms of Missoula County, Montana